IEC 63382 is an international standard defining a protocol for the management of distributed energy storage systems based on electric vehicles, which is currently under development. IEC 63382 is one of the International Electrotechnical Commission's group of standards for electric road vehicles and electric industrial trucks, and is the responsibility of Joint Working Group 15 (JWG15) of IEC Technical Committee 69 (TC69).

Standard documents 
IEC 63382 consists of the following parts, detailed in separate IEC 63382 standard documents:
 IEC 63382-1: Definitions, requirements and use cases
 IEC 63382-2: Data models, protocols and messages
 IEC 63382-3: Conformance tests

See also 
 Vehicle-to-grid
 ISO 15118
 IEC 61850
 IEC 61851
 IEC 63110
 OCPP

References 

Electric vehicles
63382